You Can't See 'Round Corners is an Australian drama and military TV series that aired on the Seven Network for 26 episodes from 12 July 1967 based on the 1947 novel by Jon Cleary, updated to be set during the Vietnam War. It was directed by David Cahill and shot around Sydney in black and white, and was adapted into a film version in 1969.

Main Cast
 Ken Shorter as Frankie McCoy
 Lyndall Barbour as Mrs. McCoy
 Rowena Wallace as Margie Harris
 Judith Fisher as Peg Clancy
 Carmen Duncan as Myra Neilson
 Slim DeGrey as Mick Patterson

Production
This was Rowena Wallace's first professional dramatic TV series. She was recommended by Barry Creyton who was originally going to play the role of Frankie McCoy, the role that went to Ken Shorter

The series garnered controversy on release because of a scene where Frankie, an army deserter, runs his hand up Margie's skirt. Wallace says she had no idea Shorter was going to do this, which is why her reaction was so authentic. Many stations around Australia cut the scene.

The majority of episodes were written by Richard Lane. Peter Weir worked on the show as a production assistant.

Reception
The show was generally well received.

See also
List of television plays broadcast on ATN-7

References

External links
You Can't See 'Round Corners (TV series) at IMDb
You Can't See 'Round Corners (TV series) at National Film and Sound Archive
You Can't See 'Round Corners TV series at AustLit

Seven Network original programming
Australian drama television series
1967 Australian television series debuts
1967 Australian television series endings
Black-and-white Australian television shows